Titus Gay (1787-1837), also known as Old Ti, was born into slavery in the town of Suffield, Connecticut, USA, and because of the Gradual Emancipation Act passed in 1784, he was freed in 1812 after reaching 25 years of age. He was buried in the northeastern corner of the cemetery behind the Congregational church in Suffield, CT.

Early life
Old Ti was born in 1787, and lived nearly his entire life in Suffield, CT. He was owned by the town minister, Reverend Ebenezer Gay Jr., at the time of his manumission.    Because his mother was enslaved by Reverend Ebenezer Gay Sr., he was born an enslaved person in the local community. His father, Titus Kent, was enslaved by Samuel Kent, who then bequeathed him to his son in his probate records. His son was Major Elihu Kent, who was a leader during the Revolutionary War and a member of the Kent family, an original land granted family from the settlement of the town. Titus Kent also fought in the Revolutionary War.

A slave in colonial America

Family life
According to Judge Smith's Old Slave Days in Connecticut  Titus was in love with a female slave known only as Phill. Shortly after running from her master she died. According to Smith, Phill dies on the run, a victim of the brutally cold Connecticut winter. Though Titus and Phill were never actually married (she died before they had the chance) this is the closest known instance in which Titus had any sort of love life. 
Old Ti was allegedly buried next to Phill. Old Ti never had any children. He was dedicated to his community and church, once he became a free man Titus would work in the church to make ends meet. Both of Titus's parents were slaves. Rose Gay, his mother served Reverend Ebenezer Gay of Suffield, CT. Titus Kent, his father, was owned by Maj. Elihu Kent, also of Suffield. Both Maj. Elihu Kent and Titus Kent served in the Connecticut Militia. After Titus Gay (Old Ti) was manumitted in 1812 by Reverend Ebenezer Gay Jr. he lived in Suffield as a free man.

Free man

Titus was emancipated at the age of twenty-five by the Gradual Emancipation Act that was passed in 1784. Even though Titus was no longer Reverend Gay's slave, he was still very much involved in the town. One of Titus's most coveted jobs was working as a tythingman. This job consisted of assisting funerals with the pastor. He made sure things in the church ran smoothly. Working as a tythingman was not the only job that Titus had. He was also the sexton, the gravedigger, the custodian of the church, and the church bell ringer. He was very much involved in the community. In the 1820s there was a day once a year called training day. Training day was a day where the town celebrated their local militia with a parade. Titus was in charge of keeping the little boys of the town out of trouble. The parents trusted him with their children.

References

1787 births
1837 deaths
People from Hartford County, Connecticut
18th-century American slaves